The Hội An Museum is a history museum located at 10B Trần Hưng Đạo, Hội An, Vietnam.

The Museum's opening hours are from 07:30 to 17:00 daily.

References

Museums in Hoi An
Military and war museums in Vietnam